Siats (/see-ats/) is an extinct genus of large theropod dinosaur known from the Late Cretaceous Cedar Mountain Formation of Utah, United States. It contains a single species, Siats meekerorum. It was initially classified as a megaraptoran, a clade of large theropods with very controversial relationships. Siats may be a neovenatorid allosauroid, a coelurosaur of uncertain phylogenetic position, or a tyrannosauroid.

Discovery
 
Its discovery was announced at the 2012 annual meeting of the Society of Vertebrate Paleontology and in 2013 it was named by Lindsay E. Zanno and Peter J. Makovicky and the type species is Siats meekerorum. The generic name is derived from the name of Siats, a man-eating monster in the Ute mythology. The specific name meekerorum honors the late geologist John Caldwell Meeker who bequeathed a fund for the support of paleontological research, his widow Withrow Meeker and their daughter Lis Meeker, one of the volunteers in the research project.

Siats is known from the holotype FMNH PR 2716, a partial postcranial skeleton housed at the Field Museum of Natural History, Chicago. FMNH PR 2716 consists of five dorsal and eight caudal vertebrae, a chevron, partial right ilium, ischium and fibula, a partial left tibia, and several right and left pedal phalanges. FMNH PR 2716 was discovered by Lindsay Zanno, as a part of a 2008 expedition of the Field Museum led by Peter Makovicky. The bones were first seen protruding out of a hillside, prompting the excavation. It was collected between 2008 and 2010 from the Mussentuchit Member of the Cedar Mountain Formation, in Emery County of Utah, dating to the early Cenomanian stage of the Late Cretaceous, approximately 94.5 million years ago.

Description

The holotype specimen, FMNH PR 2716, consists of material from a single individual that is considered skeletally immature on the basis of the incomplete fusion of neural arches to the centra of the dorsal vertebrae. Siats is characterized by seven diagnostic, including four autapomorphic (i.e. unique), traits. Its autapomorphies include the subtriangular cross section of the distal caudal vertebrae, elongated centrodiapophyseal laminae lacking noticeable infradiapophyseal fossae on the proximal caudals, a transversely concaved acetabular rim of iliac pubic peduncle, and the presence of a notch on the end of the truncated lateral brevis shelf. Other notable traits include the broad neural spines on the dorsal vertebrae.

Siats represents one of the largest known theropods from North America. The authors also wrote that the holotype specimen was already comparable in size to Saurophaganax and Acrocanthosaurus despite the visible neurocentral sutures showing absence of ossification, suggesting a skeletally immature individual.

If it is a neovenatorid, the discovery of Siats also reveals that allosauroids did not yield dominance in North America to tyrannosauroids until the late Cretaceous. However, There has been and still is substantial disagreement on the classification of this animal as well as with megaraptorans, which are usually found to be either neovenatorids or tyrannosauroids, often with both interpretations appearing in the same paper. The placement of Siats within Megaraptora itself has also been a source of controversy, with recent analyses placing it as a non-megaraptoran theropod irrespective of the placement of Megaraptora.

Phylogeny and classification
Siats was initially classified as a megaraptoran neovenatorid closely related to Chilantaisaurus upon its discovery in 2013, based on the presence of pronounced centrodiapophyseal laminae bracketed by deep infradiapophyseal fossa on the caudal neural arches, similar to that of the megaraptoran Aerosteon. In a 2014 description of a juvenile Megaraptor specimen, the referral of Siats to Megaraptora was contested, and megaraptorans were found to more likely be tyrannosauroids rather than neovenatorids such as Siats. The paper noted that, although sharing various features with Neovenator, Siats was very different from megaraptorans in the structure of its dorsal vertebrae, ilium, and fibula. A subsequent analysis conducted by Coria and Currie (2016), which even placed megaraptorans as neovenatorids, still placed Siats and Chilantaisaurus as neovenatorids outside of Megaraptora. However, Bell et al. (2016) recovered Siats as a member of Coelurosauria of uncertain phylogenetic placement within this group; the analysis indicated that Siats might either be a relative of ornithomimosaurs, a theropod more closely related to maniraptorans than tyrannosauroids, a basal megaraptoran, or a tyrannosauroid more closely related to tyrannosaurids than Xiongguanlong.

 
The cladogram presented below (created prior to these more recent studies) follows Zanno & Makovicky (2013).

References

Prehistoric tetanurans
Late Cretaceous dinosaurs of North America
 
Fossil taxa described in 2013
Taxa named by Lindsay Zanno
Paleontology in Utah